This is a list of National Hockey League (NHL) players who have played at least one game in the NHL from 1917 to present and have a last name that starts with "R".

List updated as of the 2018–19 NHL season.

Ra 

 Antti Raanta
 Karel Rachunek
 Andre Racicot
 Bruce Racine
 Jonathan Racine
 Yves Racine
 Lukas Radil
 Branko Radivojevic
 Harry "Yip" Radley
 Alexander Radulov
 Igor Radulov
 Nate Raduns
 Brian Rafalski
 Brogan Rafferty
 Michael Raffl
 Clare Raglan
 Herb Raglan
 Marcus Ragnarsson
 Rickard Rakell
 Rhett Rakhshani
 Don Raleigh
 Greg Rallo
 Brad Ralph
 Jamie Ram
 John Ramage
 Rob Ramage
 Tim Ramholt
 Karri Ramo
 Beattie Ramsay
 Craig Ramsay
 Les Ramsay
 Mike Ramsey
 Wayne Ramsey
 Ken Randall
 Tyler Randell
 Bill Ranford
 Brendan Ranford
 Paul Ranger
 Paul Ranheim
 George Ranieri
 Mikko Rantanen
 Joonas Rask
 Tuukka Rask
 Victor Rask
 Dennis Rasmussen
 Erik Rasmussen
 Michael Rasmussen
 Peter Ratchuk
 Jean Ratelle
 Mike Rathje
 Jake Rathwell
 Ty Rattie
 Dan Ratushny
 Chad Rau
 Kyle Rau
 Errol Rausse
 Pekka Rautakallio
 Matt Ravlich
 Rob Ray
 Andrew Raycroft
 Alain Raymond
 Armand Raymond
 Mason Raymond
 Paul "Marcel" Raymond
 Chuck Rayner

Re 

 Matt Read
 Melvin Read
 Ryan Ready
 Ken Reardon
 Terry Reardon
 Marty Reasoner
 Daryl Reaugh
 Marc Reaume
 Ryan Reaves
 Billy Reay
 Mark Recchi
 Joel Rechlicz
 Gord Redahl
 Wade Redden
 Eldon "Pokey" Reddick
 George Redding
 Liam Reddox
 Craig Redmond
 Dick Redmond
 Keith Redmond
 Mickey Redmond
 Zach Redmond
 Greg Redquest
 Dave Reece
 Mark Reeds
 Joe Reekie
 Dylan Reese
 Jeff Reese
 Bill Regan
 Larry Regan
 Richie Regehr
 Robyn Regehr
 Darcy Regier
 Steve Regier
 Peter Regin
 Brent Regner
 Earl Reibel
 Jeremy Reich
 Robert Reichel
 Craig Reichert
 Brandon Reid
 Darren Reid
 Dave Reid (born 1934)
 Dave Reid (born 1964)
 Gerry Reid
 Gordon Reid
 Reg Reid
 Tom Reid
 Dave Reierson
 Ed Reigle
 Mike Reilly
 James Reimer
 Griffin Reinhart
 Max Reinhart
 Paul Reinhart
 Sam Reinhart
 Ollie Reinikka
 Mitch Reinke
 Steven Reinprecht
 Todd Reirden
 Leo Reise
 Leo Reise Jr.
 Eric Reitz
 Sheldon Rempal
 Mark Renaud
 Mikael Renberg
 Borna Rendulic
 Dan Renouf
 Michal Repik
 Glenn "Chico" Resch
 Tarmo Reunanen
 Bobby Reynolds

Rh–Ri 

 Jon Rheault
 Herb Rheaume
 Pascal Rheaume
 Damian Rhodes
 Pat Ribble
 Mike Ribeiro
 Mike Ricci
 Nick Ricci
 Steven Rice
 Anthony Richard
 Henri Richard
 Jacques Richard
 Jean-Marc Richard
 Maurice "Rocket" Richard
 Mike Richard
 Tanner Richard
 Brad Richards
 Mike Richards
 Todd Richards
 Travis Richards
 Brad Richardson
 Dave Richardson
 Glen Richardson
 Ken Richardson
 Luke Richardson
 Terry Richardson
 Bob Richer
 Stephane Richer (defenceman)
 Stephane Richer (forward)
 Danny Richmond
 Steve Richmond
 Barry Richter
 Dave Richter
 Mike Richter
 Curt Ridley
 Mike Ridley
 Tobias Rieder
 Morgan Rielly
 Vincent Riendeau
 Michel Riesen
 Dennis Riggin
 Pat Riggin
 Juuso Riikola
 Bill Riley
 Jack Riley
 James Riley
 Zac Rinaldo
 Bob Ring
 Pekka Rinne
 Howard Riopelle
 Gerry Rioux
 Pierre Rioux
 Vic Ripley
 Doug Risebrough
 Rasmus Rissanen
 Gary Rissling
 Patrick Rissmiller
 Rasmus Ristolainen
 Jani Rita
 Bob Ritchie
 Brett Ritchie
 Byron Ritchie
 Dave Ritchie
 Nick Ritchie
 Mattias Ritola
 Alex Ritson
 David Rittich
 Al Rittinger
 Bobby Rivard
 Fern Rivard
 Gus Rivers
 Jamie Rivers
 Shawn Rivers
 Wayne Rivers
 Craig Rivet
 Garth Rizzuto

Ro

 Andy Roach
 John Roach
 Mickey Roach
 Colby Robak
 Mario Roberge
 Serge Roberge
 Claude Robert
 Rene Robert
 Phil Roberto
 David Roberts
 Doug Roberts
 Gary Roberts
 Gordie Roberts
 Jim Roberts (born 1940)
 Jim Roberts (born 1956)
 Moe Roberts
 Earl Robertson
 Fred Robertson
 Geordie Robertson
 George Robertson
 Jason Robertson
 Nicholas Robertson
 Torrie Robertson
 Bert Robertsson
 Stephane Robidas
 Florent Robidoux
 Bobby Robins
 Charles "Buddy" Robinson
 Doug Robinson
 Earl Robinson
 Eric Robinson
 Larry Robinson
 Moe Robinson
 Nathan Robinson
 Rob Robinson
 Scott Robinson
 Louis Robitaille
 Luc Robitaille
 Mike Robitaille
 Randy Robitaille
 Dave Roche
 Desse Roche
 Earl Roche
 Ernie Roche
 Travis Roche
 Dave Rochefort
 Leon Rochefort
 Normand Rochefort
 Harvey Rockburn
 Eddie Rodden
 Jack Rodewald
 Marc Rodgers
 Anton Rodin
 Bryan Rodney
 Evan Rodrigues
 Jeremy Roenick
 Stacy Roest
 John Rogers
 Mike Rogers
 Jeff Rohlicek
 Leif Rohlin
 Jon Rohloff
 Todd Rohloff
 Dale Rolfe
 Al Rollins
 Dwayne Roloson
 Brian Rolston
 Larry Romanchych
 Russ Romaniuk
 Roberto Romano
 Alexander Romanov
 Doug Rombough
 Aaron Rome
 Dale Rominski
 Elwin "Doc" Romnes
 Ed Ronan
 Skene Ronan
 Cliff Ronning
 Jonas Ronnqvist
 Len Ronson
 Paul Ronty
 Kevin Rooney
 Steve Rooney
 Bill Root
 Pavel Rosa
 Mike Rosati
 Jay Rosehill
 Calle Rosen
 Jack Roslovic
 Art Ross
 Jared Ross
 Jim Ross
 Felix "Rollie" Rossignol
 Kyle Rossiter
 Darcy Rota
 Randy Rota
 Sammy Rothschild
 Orville "Rolly" Roulston
 Tom Roulston
 Magnus Roupe
 Allan Rourke
 Bob Rouse
 Bobby Rousseau
 Guy Rousseau
 Rollie Rousseau
 Antoine Roussel
 Dominic Roussel
 Jean-Marc Routhier
 Bobby Rowe
 Mike Rowe
 Ronnie Rowe
 Tom Rowe
 Carter Rowney
 Andre Roy
 Derek Roy
 Jean-Yves Roy
 Kevin Roy
 Matt Roy
 Mathieu Roy
 Nicolas Roy
 Patrick Roy
 Stephane Roy (born 1967)
 Stephane Roy (born 1976)
 Gaetan Royer
 Remi Royer
 Michal Rozsival
 Gino Rozzini

Ru–Ry 

 German Rubtsov
 Steve Rucchin
 Mike Rucinski (born 1963)
 Mike Rucinski (born 1975)
 Martin Rucinsky
 Cody Rudkowsky
 Bernie Ruelle
 Jason Ruff
 Lindy Ruff
 Kent Ruhnke
 Darren Rumble
 David Rundblad
 Thomas Rundqvist
 Paul Runge
 Arttu Ruotsalainen
 Reijo Ruotsalainen
 Duane Rupp
 Michael Rupp
 Pat Rupp
 Terry Ruskowski
 Cam Russell
 Church Russell
 Kris Russell
 Patrick Russell
 Phil Russell
 Ryan Russell
 Robbie Russo
 Bryan Rust
 Jim Rutherford
 Wayne Rutledge
 Jan Rutta
 Christian Ruuttu
 Jarkko Ruutu
 Tuomo Ruutu
 Stefan Ruzicka
 Vladimir Ruzicka
 Bobby Ryan
 Derek Ryan
 Joakim Ryan
 Matt Ryan
 Michael Ryan
 Prestin Ryan
 Terry Ryan
 Kerby Rychel
 Warren Rychel
 Mark Rycroft
 Michael Ryder
 Andy Rymsha
 Jussi Rynnas
 Rick Rypien
 Jason Ryznar

See also
 hockeydb.com NHL Player List - R

Players